The women's 4 × 100 metre freestyle relay event at the 2012 Summer Olympics took place on 28 July at the London Aquatics Centre in London, United Kingdom.

The Australian women's team fought off an early lead by their American rivals and overhauled the field down the stretch to recapture the Olympic freestyle relay title they last held in 2004. The foursome of Alicia Coutts (53.90), Cate Campbell (53.19), Brittany Elmslie (53.41), and Melanie Schlanger (52.65) put together a blazing fast finish with a new Olympic record in 3:33.15.

The Netherlands nearly pulled a worst-to-first effort, building from an eighth-place turn by Inge Dekker (54.67), fifth by Marleen Veldhuis (53.80), and third by Femke Heemskerk (53.39), until they handed Ranomi Kromowidjojo the anchor duties on the final exchange. She delivered a fastest freestyle split in the field with an anchor of 51.93 to race against the Americans for the silver in 3:33.79, but finished just 0.64 seconds off the pace posted by the Australians. Meanwhile, the U.S. team got off an early lead from Missy Franklin (53.52) and Jessica Hardy (53.53), but slipped through the final stretches from Lia Neal (53.65) and Allison Schmitt (53.54) to settle for the bronze in an American record of 3:34.24. Building a new milestone, Neal became the first ever African-American female to swim in an Olympic final, while Natalie Coughlin, who competed earlier in the relay prelims, picked up her twelfth career medal to share a three-way tie with Dara Torres and Jenny Thompson as the most decorated female Olympic swimmers of all time.

China (3:36.75), Great Britain (3:37.02), Denmark (3:37.45), and Japan (3:37.96) also vied for an Olympic medal to round out the championship finale, while Sweden was disqualified from the race because of an early relay takeoff by anchor Gabriella Fagundez.

Records
Prior to this competition, the existing world and Olympic records were as follows.

The following records were established during the competition:

Results

Heats

Final

References

External links
NBC Olympics Coverage

Women's 4 x 100 metre freestyle relay
4 × 100 metre freestyle relay
Olympics
2012 in women's swimming
Women's events at the 2012 Summer Olympics